Harold William Riggall (24 January 1882 – 11 January 1930) was an Australian rules footballer who played with Melbourne in the Victorian Football League (VFL).

Notes

External links 

Harold Riggall on Demonwiki

1882 births
1930 deaths
Australian rules footballers from Victoria (Australia)
Melbourne Football Club players